Alfred Clint (1843 – 21 November 1923) was an Australian cartoonist and theatrical scene painter and member of a notable family of artists.

History 
Clint was born in Kensington, England, son of marine landscapist Alfred Clint and grandson of portraitist George Clint.
	
He left for Australia, where he joined with John Hennings in 1867, painting the scenery for a production of Antony and Cleopatra at the Theatre Royal, Melbourne, starring Walter Montgomery, followed by a Christmas pantomime written by W. M. Akhurst.
Other burlesques and plays followed, culminating in After Dark, "a tale of London life", at the Prince of Wales Opera House in July 1869.
In 1870 Clint and W. J. Wilson constructed a great diorama for the Theatre Royal, Melbourne, chronicling the "foundation an progress of Australia", and set up again in Sydney the following year.

In 1873 he arrived in Adelaide under contract to Samuel Lazar at the Theatre Royal, meanwhile drawing cartoons for the short-lived (1873–1874) Mirror,  The Portonian, and The Lantern, making a speciality of assemblages of rapid and accurate caricatures of well-known citizens, then moved to Sydney to work for Sydney Punch, which in 1879 published a large print containing caricatures of 100 famous Sydneysiders. He contributed to The Bulletin from its inception in 1880.

He was a friend of W. B. Spong, father of Hilda Spong and scene painter for Brough and Boucicault.

Family 
George Clint (1770–1854) ARA portraitist
Raphael Clint (1797–1849) lithographer and printer in Australia, returned to UK c. 1885.
Scipio Clint (1805–1839) medal and seal engraver
Alfred Clint (1807–1883) known for coastal landscapes
Alfred Clint (1843 – 19 November 1923) married Mary Jane Percy Lake ( – c. 10 October 1918) on 22 June 1872
Helena Clint (died 1958) married Frank Fox (1874–1960) on 13 June 1894. Later Sir Frank, he was editor of The Lone Hand. They had a son and two daughters.
Alfred Thomas Clint (1879? 1882 – c. 5 September 1936) watercolorist
George Edmund Clint ( – 14 April 1952) also exhibited. He and brother Alfred formed scene painting partnership.
Ethel Mary Clint married Walter James Dale on 31 March 1905
Edward Clint painter
Beatrice Clint
Dorothy Una Clint married Edward Robinson on 15 March 2013
Sydney Raphael Clint (28 July 1883 – 4 August 1930), of Blacktown, was a scene painter

References 

19th-century Australian painters
Australian cartoonists
Australian scenic designers
Australian caricaturists
1843 births
1923 deaths